Curtis Wayne Jordan (born January 25, 1954) is a former American football safety in the National Football League (NFL) for the Tampa Bay Buccaneers and Washington Redskins.  He played college football at Texas Tech University and was drafted in the sixth round of the 1976 NFL Draft.

Since retiring from football in 1986, Jordan has been involved in the restaurant business in Lubbock. His interest in restaurants was sparked during the 1982 NFL players strike. Jordan was involved in the operation of several East Coast restaurants before returning to Lubbock, where he owns Cujo's Sportz Bar, 50th Street Caboose, and the Copper Caboose. In July 2009, he opened the first Five Guys Burgers and Fries chain outlet in Lubbock. Within five weeks, the restaurant was ranked No. 2 in Texas for sales.

References

Tampa Bay Buccaneers players
Washington Redskins players
Texas Tech Red Raiders football players
People from Lubbock, Texas
American football safeties
1954 births
Living people